This is a list  of bestselling novels  in the United States in the 2000s (decade), as determined by Publishers Weekly. The list features the most popular novels of each year from 2000 through 2009.

The books in the Harry Potter series are excluded "because of the way AAP [Assoc of American Publishers] measures industry sales. The organization takes actual sales from 81 reporting companies (including Potter publisher Scholastic) and then uses Census Bureau data to extrapolate sales for the entire industry. In the past, the inclusion of Potter novels has distorted growth (and, in non-Potter years, the decline) of the children's category."

2000
 The Brethren by John Grisham
 The Mark: The Beast Rules the World by Jerry B. Jenkins and Tim LaHaye
 The Bear and the Dragon by Tom Clancy
 The Indwelling: The Beast Takes Possession by Jerry B. Jenkins and Tim LaHaye
 The Last Precinct by Patricia Cornwell
 Journey by Danielle Steel
 The Rescue by Nicholas Sparks
 Roses Are Red by James Patterson
 Cradle and All by James Patterson
 The House on Hope Street by Danielle Steel

2001
 Desecration by Jerry B. Jenkins and Tim LaHaye
 Skipping Christmas by John Grisham
 A Painted House by John Grisham
 Dreamcatcher by Stephen King
 The Corrections by Jonathan Franzen
 Black House by Stephen King and Peter Straub
 The Kiss by Danielle Steel
 Valhalla Rising by Clive Cussler
 A Day Late and a Dollar Short by Terry McMillan
 Violets Are Blue by James Patterson

2002
 The Summons by John Grisham
 Red Rabbit by Tom Clancy
 The Remnant by Jerry B. Jenkins and Tim LaHaye
 The Lovely Bones by Alice Sebold
 Prey by Michael Crichton
 Skipping Christmas by John Grisham
 The Shelters of Stone by Jean M. Auel
 Four Blind Mice by James Patterson
 Everything's Eventual: 14 Dark Tales by Stephen King
 The Nanny Diaries by Emma McLaughlin and Nicola Kraus

2003
 The Da Vinci Code by Dan Brown
 The Five People You Meet in Heaven by Mitch Albom
 The King of Torts by John Grisham
 Bleachers by John Grisham
 Armageddon by Tim LaHaye and Jerry B. Jenkins
 The Teeth of the Tiger by Tom Clancy
 The Big Bad Wolf by James Patterson
 Blow Fly by Patricia Cornwell
 The Lovely Bones by Alice Sebold
 The Wedding by Nicholas Sparks

2004
 The Da Vinci Code by Dan Brown
 The Five People You Meet in Heaven by Mitch Albom
 The Last Juror by John Grisham
 Glorious Appearing by Jerry B. Jenkins and Tim LaHaye
 Angels & Demons by Dan Brown
 State of Fear by Michael Crichton
 London Bridges by James Patterson
 Trace by Patricia Cornwell
 The Rule of Four by Ian Caldwell and Dustin Thomason
 The Da Vinci Code: Special Illustrated Collector's Edition by Dan Brown

2005
 The Broker by John Grisham
 The Da Vinci Code by Dan Brown
 Mary, Mary by James Patterson
 At First Sight by Nicholas Sparks
 Predator by Patricia Cornwell
 True Believer by Nicholas Sparks
 Light from Heaven by Jan Karon
 The Historian by Elizabeth Kostova
 The Mermaid Chair by Sue Monk Kidd
 Eleven on Top by Janet Evanovich

2006
 For One More Day by Mitch Albom
 Cross by James Patterson
 Dear John by Nicholas Sparks
 Next by Michael Crichton
 Hannibal Rising by Thomas Harris
 Lisey's Story by Stephen King
 Twelve Sharp by Janet Evanovich
 Cell by Stephen King
 Beach Road by James Patterson and Peter de Jonge
 The 5th Horseman by James Patterson and Maxine Paetro

2007
 A Thousand Splendid Suns by Khaled Hosseini
 Playing For Pizza by John Grisham
 Double Cross by James Patterson
 The Choice by Nicholas Sparks
 Lean Mean Thirteen by Janet Evanovich
 Plum Lovin' by Janet Evanovich
 Book of the Dead by Patricia Cornwell
 The Quickie by James Patterson and Michael Ledwidge
 The 6th Target by James Patterson and Maxine Paetro
 The Darkest Evening of the Year by Dean Koontz

2008
 The Appeal by John Grisham
 The Story of Edgar Sawtelle by David Wroblewski
 The Host by Stephenie Meyer
 Cross Country by James Patterson
 The Lucky One by Nicholas Sparks
 Fearless Fourteen by Janet Evanovich
 Christmas Sweater by Glenn Beck
 Scarpetta by Patricia Cornwell
 Your Heart Belongs to Me by Dean Koontz
 Plum Lucky by Janet Evanovich

2009
 The Lost Symbol by Dan Brown
 The Associate by John Grisham
 The Help by Kathryn Stockett
 I, Alex Cross by James Patterson
 The Last Song by Nicholas Sparks
 Ford County by John Grisham
 Finger Lickin' Fifteen by Janet Evanovich
 The Host by Stephenie Meyer
 Under the Dome by Stephen King
 Pirate Latitudes by Michael Crichton

References

Publishers Weekly bestselling novels series
Novels
Novels
2000s books